Åby IF is a Swedish football club located in Åby.

Background
Åby IF currently plays in Division 4 Östergötland Östra which is the sixth tier of Swedish football. They play their home matches at the Åby IP in Åby.

The club is affiliated to Östergötlands Fotbollförbund.

Season to season

In their most successful period Åby IF competed in the following divisions:

In recent seasons Åby IF have competed in the following divisions:

Footnotes

External links
 Åby IF – Official website
 Åby IF on Facebook

Football clubs in Östergötland County